Nagoya is a Japanese city.

Nagoya may refer to:
Nogoyá
Nagoya, Batam
Nagoya Protocol, an instrument of international law on biodiversity, specifically on access to and benefit sharing from the utilization of genetic resources
Morgan Nagoya (1982), a French DJ